The 2023 UEFA Women's Under-19 Championship qualifying competition is a women's under-19 football competition that will determine the seven teams joining the automatically qualified hosts Belgium in the 2023 UEFA Women's Under-19 Championship final tournament.

52 teams, including hosts Belgium, entered the qualifying competition. Players born on or after 1 January 2004 are eligible to participate.

Gibraltar entered a women's national team in any UEFA competition for the first time ever.

Format
Last season, UEFA implemented a new format for the women's U17 and U19 Euros, based on a league-style qualifying format.

The teams are divided in two leagues: League A (28 teams) and League B (24 teams).

Each league will play two rounds:
Round 1: In each league, groups of 4 teams will play mini-tournaments. The winners of each mini-tournament in league B and the best runner-up will be promoted and the last-placed teams in league A mini-tournaments will be relegated.
Round 2: The seven winners of League A will qualify for the final tournament. The six winners of mini-tournaments in league B and the best runner-up will be promoted and the last-placed teams in league A will be relegated for Round 1 of the next edition of the tournament.

Tiebreakers
In Round 1 and Round 2, teams are ranked according to points (3 points for a win, 1 point for a draw, 0 points for a loss), and if tied on points, the following tiebreaking criteria are applied, in the order given, to determine the rankings (Regulations Articles 19.01 and 19.02):
Points in head-to-head matches among tied teams;
Goal difference in head-to-head matches among tied teams;
Goals scored in head-to-head matches among tied teams;
If more than two teams are tied, and after applying all head-to-head criteria above, a subset of teams are still tied, all head-to-head criteria above are reapplied exclusively to this subset of teams;
Goal difference in all group matches;
Goals scored in all group matches;
Penalty shoot-out if only two teams have the same number of points, and they met in the last round of the group and are tied after applying all criteria above (not used if more than two teams have the same number of points, or if their rankings are not relevant for qualification for the next stage);
Disciplinary points (red card = 3 points, yellow card = 1 point, expulsion for two yellow cards in one match = 3 points);
Position in the applicable ranking:
for teams in round 1, position in 2021–22 round 2 league rankings;
for teams in round 2, position in the round 1 league ranking.

To determine the five best third-placed teams from the qualifying round, the results against the teams in fourth place are discarded. The following criteria are applied (Regulations Article 15.01):
Points;
Goal difference;
Goals scored;
Disciplinary points;
Position in the applicable ranking:
for teams in round 1, position in the coefficient rankings;
for teams in round 2, position in the round 1 league ranking.

Round 1

Draw
The draw for the qualifying round was held on 31 May 2022, at the UEFA headquarters in Nyon, Switzerland.

The teams were seeded according to their final group standings of the 2021–22 competition (Regulations Article 13.01).

Each group contained one team from Pot A, one team from Pot B, one team from Pot C, and one team from Pot D. For political reasons, Armenia and Azerbaijan and Bosnia & Herzegovina and Kosovo would not be drawn in the same group.

To determine the 2021–22 Round 2 league rankings, the following criteria was followed:
higher position in the following classification:
League A Round 2 group winners
League A Round 2 group runners-up
League A Round 2 third-placed teams
Teams promoted from League B
Teams relegated from League A
League B Round 2 runners-up
League B Round 2 third-placed teams
League B Round 2 fourth-placed teams
higher number of points in all mini-tournament matches;
superior goal difference in all mini-tournament matches;
higher number of goals scored in all mini-tournament matches;
lower disciplinary points (red card = 3 points, yellow card = 1 point, expulsion for two yellow cards in one match = 3 points);
higher position in the 2021–22 round 1 league rankings.

League A
All the matches will be played between 4 October and 15 November 2022.

Group A1

Group A2

Group A3

Group A4

Group A5

Group A6

Group A7

League B
All the matches will be played between 4 October and 15 November 2022.

Group B1

Group B2

Group B3

Group B4

Group B5

Group B6

Group B7

Round 2
28 will advance to this round League A: 21 transferred from Round 1 and seven promoted from Round 2. The teams will be divided in seven four-group teams. The seven group champions will join Belgium in the 2023 finals.

League A
Times are CET/CEST, as listed by UEFA (local times, if different, are in parentheses).

Group A1

Group A2

Group A3

Group A4

Group A5

Group A6

Group A7

League B
Times are CET/CEST, as listed by UEFA (local times, if different, are in parentheses).

Group B1

Group B2

Group B3

Group B4

Group B4

Group B6

Group B4

Qualified teams
Seven teams will qualify for the final tournament along with hosts Belgium.

1 Bold indicates champions for that year. Italic indicates hosts for that year.

Goalscorers
In the Round 1 

In the Round 2 

In total,

Notes

References

External links

2023
2022 in women's association football
2023 in women's association football
2022 in youth association football
2023 in youth association football
Current association football seasons